

By population
as of 1 January 2008

By area

By density

Estonia
Counties, Ranked list